Pure Garage is a successful series of UK garage compilation albums. Nearly all of them are mixed by DJ EZ.

In January 2000, Warner Music chose Kiss 100's DJ EZ to mix Pure Garage, a new garage compilation CD. Pure Garage went on to receive platinum record sales and peaked at number 2 on the UK national compilation chart. The Pure Garage series is the most acknowledged and best-selling UK garage compilation series to date. The series has sold over 2 million records. Pure Garage Rewind Back to the Old Skool was released on 3 December 2007; after just two weeks on sale it had already earned itself gold disc status with over 100,000 copies sold. The Very Best of Pure Garage, released on 1 December 2008, is the first Pure Garage CD that was not mixed by DJ EZ, rather it was mixed by Matt "Jam" Lamont. In March 2011, a new compilation was released, named Pure Garage Anthems, mixed by Jason Kaye of Top Buzz.

Pure Garage albums
 Pure Garage (2CD) - Released: 31 January 2000
 Pure Garage II (2CD) - Released: 3 July 2000
 Pure Garage III (2CD) - Released: 13 November 2000
 Pure Garage IV (2CD) - Released: 5 March 2001
 Pure Garage V (2CD) - Released: 29 October 2001 Warning strong language in track 8 in CD1 and track 1 in CD2
 Pure Garage Presents Bass Breaks & Beats (2CD) - Released: 3 December 2001
 Pure Garage Platinum: The Very Best of... (3CD) - Released: 9 December 2002
 Bass Breaks & Beats 2003 (2CD) - Released: 30 December 2002
 Pure Garage Classics (3CD) - Released: 24 November 2003 Parental Advisory 
 Pure Garage Presents Four to the Floor (2CD) - Released: 29 December 2003
 Pure Garage Presents the Main Room Sessions (3CD) - Released: 16 May 2005
 Pure Garage Rewind Back to the Old Skool (4CD) - Released: 3 December 2007
 Pure Garage Presents Pure Bassline (3CD) - Released: 30 June 2008
 The Very Best of Pure Garage (4CD) - Released: 1 December 2008 (mixed by Matt "Jam" Lamont)
 Pure Garage Presents 100 Garage Classics (5CD) - Released: 28 December 2009
 Pure Garage Anthems (5CD) - Released: 28 March 2011 (mixed by Jason Kaye)
 Pure Garage Reload (3CD) - Released: 27 April 2015
 Pure Garage Wallop 2016 (3CD) - Released 19 May 2017 (mixed by FooR)
Some titles were also released on cassette and vinyl.

References

External links
 DJ EZ's official website
 Matt "Jam" Lamont's official website

UK garage
UK garage albums
Compilation album series
Compilation albums by British artists
DJ mix album series